Rubens Farias Jr. (born 1954) is a Brazilian psychic surgeon, who claims to be a channel for the spirit of Dr. Fritz. His clinic is in Bom Sucesso, a suburb of Rio de Janeiro.

Rubens was trained as an engineer.

He is not the first Brazilian to make the claim. He follows Zé Arigó, who died in a car crash in 1971, and a string of other claimants. Farias began claiming reincarnation as early as 1986. On a typical weekday, as many as 800 patients will line up outside the hall he uses (on weekends, it serves as a bar), waiting for treatment sessions which might be as short as 30 seconds. While in character as Dr. Fritz, he adopts a German accent and expressions such as "Schnell!" In some cases, patients get a homemade injection, reportedly a mixture of alcohol, iodine and turpentine. Medical hygiene is minimal.

The Regional Medical Council for the state of Rio de Janeiro labels Farias a "charlatan" taking advantage of the chaotic Brazilian public health system, and has sued to halt his activities.

References

Sources 
 Rio Journal;Live, in Brazil (Again): The Reincarnated Dr. Fritz

External links
  Fritz Healing - The Anomalist archive

1954 births
Living people
Supernatural healing
Channellers